The 2022 Desert Showcase was the twelfth edition of the Desert Showcase, a preseason exhibition soccer tournament among Major League Soccer (MLS) and United Soccer League (USL) teams. The MLS portion was held from January 26 to February 5, 2022 and the USL portion will take place from February 16 to 26, 2022, at the Kino Sports Complex in Tucson.

Teams
The following teams participated in the tournament

Major League Soccer
 Seattle Sounders FC
 Portland Timbers
 Sporting Kansas City
 Colorado Rapids
 Houston Dynamo FC

Real Salt Lake was invited but the club withdrew from the event due to scheduling conflicts and technical considerations. Real Salt Lake was replaced with Sounders rival Portland Timbers for this match.

USL Championship
 Louisville City FC
 El Paso Locomotive FC
 Oakland Roots SC
 FC Tulsa

USL League One
 FC Tucson

Matches

Major League Soccer

USL Championship

References

External links

Desert cup
2022 in American soccer
2022 in sports in Arizona